Blake Nikitaras (born 29 April 2000) is na Australian cricketer who plays for New South Wales and Sydney Thunder. He is a left-handed batsman. He is the son of international cricketer Steve Nikitaras.

Early life
Nikitas is from Oak Flats in the Illawarra region of New South Wales. He plays for St George Cricket Club in NSW Premier Cricket.

Career
Ahead of the 2020-21 season Nikitaras injured his anterior cruciate ligament playing a friendly game of basketball and missed the majority of the season instead rehabbing for months at the Australian Institute of Sport in Canberra.

In March 2022 Nikitaras made his first-class debut for New South Wales scoring 44 and 56 against the South Australia cricket team in the Sheffield Shield. This earned him a rookie deal with NSW for the 2022-23 season.

In December 2022 Nikitaras was given a contract for the Big Bash League with Sydney Thunder.

Personal life
He is the son of former professional cricketer Steve Nikitaras.

References

Living people
Australian cricketers
Sydney Thunder cricketers
Cricketers from New South Wales
2000 births